Juan Matute Guímon (born 14 November 1997, Madrid) is a Spanish/American equestrian athlete. He competed at the World Equestrian Games in Tryon 2018 and at various European Youth Championships. His father Juan Matute competed at the 1988 Olympic Games, 1992 Olympic Games and the 1996 Olympic Games.

Biography
Juan started riding at the age of 6 in Spain. In 2008 he moved to the United States where he relocated in Wellington, Florida where his father worked as a coach. In 2018 he gained the American citizenship after ten years living in the US. In 2018 he relocated back to Spain where he wanted to focus on his study International Relations at the Francisco de Vitoria University in Madrid and to establish his riding career in Europe. He started riding on the highest Dressage level already at an age of 16. He also represents the FEI at several media platforms and was the presenter of the FEI Awards in 2018 and 2019.

Personal life
Juan's sister Paula Matute is also an international dressage rider and lives in Wellington. He has also a younger brother who does not compete. He is fluent in English Spanish and German.

Heavy accident
On Tuesday 5 May 2020 he was hospitalized with a Arteriovenous Malformation brain bleeding. When he had several headaches in the week before the accident, he felt unwell after he rode a horse. He then got off the horse, after which he collapsed. He was subsequently taken to hospital in a critical condition by helicopter to the La Paz Hospital in Madrid, where he was operated on for his brain haemorrhage. Juan was in an artificial coma for three weeks. On 3 July he left the hospital and was allowed to start his rehabilitation process.

References

1997 births
Living people
Spanish male equestrians
Spanish dressage riders
Sportspeople from Madrid
Spanish emigrants to the United States
Francisco de Vitoria University alumni